The British and Commonwealth Women's Association is a private members club, based in Paris, for women who are British nationals or Commonwealth citizens.

References

External links

Women's organizations based in France
1962 establishments in France
Organizations based in Paris
Clubs and societies in France
Women in Paris